The 2015–16 Mohun Bagan A.C. season is the 126th season of Mohun Bagan A.C. since the club's formation in 1889 and their 9th season in the I-League which is India's top football league. During this season, Mohun Bagan started the I-League as the defending champions (having won it last season). The team finished 3rd in the Calcutta Football league and runners-up in the I-League. Mohun Bagan were defeated by Shandong Luneng of China in the preliminary round 2 of the AFC Champions League and were eliminated from the competition at this stage. They bowed out of the AFC Cup in the round of 16 where they were defeated by the Tampines Rovers of Singapore. They were crowned Champions of the Federation Cup after they defeated Aizawl in the final.

Season overview

August
On 9 August, Bagan started their season in the Calcutta Football League. Their start though wasn't as promising as their rivals, East Bengal.They started their campaign against Mohammedan but weren't strong enough to score against them even after a Mohammedan player was sent off in the first half. The game finished with a scoreline that read 0–0. Their next match was against SAI Darjeeling. This match again was a disappointment for Bagan as they failed to score against a comparatively weaker opponent. This match ended 0–0 even though SAI Darjeeling played half of the game with u-20 players.They played their next match against Southern Samity in which Bagan registered their first victory of the season. The Green and Maroon brigade won the match 5–2 in which Dudu Omagbemi scored a hat-trick and Katsumi Yusa scored the other two. They continued their winning ways in the next match against Bengal Nagpur Railway with a 3–0 drubbing of the weaker opponents. Katsumi Yusa scored a brace containing a free-kick goal and the other one was added by Dudu Omagbemi.On 25 August Bagan tasted defeat for the first time in the season losing 1–0 against Army XI.They returned to winning ways in the next game against Tollygunge Agragami where they defeated them 3–1, courtesy of two goals from Dudu Omagbemi and another from Lalkamal Bhowmick who scored after many games to be the first Indian to score for Bagan this season. On 31 August, Bagan's match against Aryan was abandoned after 20 minutes of play due to heavy rain and the scoreline hung at 0–0.

September
On 3 September they were up against Police AC and they won by 4–1 where Kean Lewis registered himself on the score sheet with a bang by scoring a brace.On 6 September Bagan were up against their fiercest rivals East Bengal for the Kolkata Derby where they suffered a humiliating 4–0 loss and were out of the Calcutta Football League championship run. They played their last but one match against Kalighat M.S. and defeated them 4–1, courtesy of goals from Katsumi Yusa, Ram Malik, Azharuddin Mallick and Pankaj Moula. Their last match was against Aryan where they failed to break the deadlock as the Aryan goalie kept his goal safe and sound. The match ended 0–0.More misery was about to come for the Mariners when the IFA announced deduction of 3 points from Bagan's tally, as they played the last few minutes of their match with Tollygunge Agragami without the mandatory u-23 player on the field. The match was counted as a loss for Mohun Bagan and all the goals scored in the match were nullified.

October–December
The Hero ISL 2015 that started on 3 October and continued till 20 December put a brake on the Indian domestic football season as most players from various clubs joined the ISL franchisees. On 2 October, Bagan pulled off a stunning transfer by signing the Trinidad world-cupper Cornell Glen from Shillong Lajong filling in the void of the 4th foreign recruit, although the drama continued over the signing of Sony Norde. All controversies were however put to rest when the Haitian International himself confirmed his joining Mohun Bagan for the season while he was in Kolkata as part of the Mumbai City team that faced Atlético de Kolkata in an ISL match. Mohun Bagan did not take part in any competitive tournaments in these three months. They played a few friendlies and exhibition games against a few local teams where Cornell Glen found the back of the net regularly.

January
Right before the start of the I-League Bagan smelled a breath of fresh air with Indian international Jeje Lalpekhlua and Mumbai City midfielder Brandon Fernandes confirming their association with the Green and Maroon brigade. Mohun Bagan decided to release Haitian international Judelin Aveska before the start of the I-League and decided to sign former Pune defender Luciano Sabrosa adding a lot of strength to a jittery defensive line. Bagan started off their I-League campaign with a 3–1 win over minnows and newcomers Aizawl, where Glen scored a brace while Balwant Singh netted in the third. They kept up their winning habits in the second match as well, where they defeated Salgaocar 4–2. The Green and Maroon brigade went in as the favorites in the year's first Derby when they met arch rivals East Bengal. The match ended in a 1–1 stalemate where Ranti Martins put the Red and Golds in the lead, only to be equalized by Cornell Glen 10 minutes later.Mohun Bagan created history in the AFC Champions League when they defeated the Tampines Rovers of Singapore 3–1, becoming the first Indian club to win a match at this level, since the competition was re-formatted in 2009. In a match that saw a series of missed chances by the Green and Maroon brigade, it was the magic left foot of Sony Norde that proved fatal for the Tampines Rovers. Jeje Lalpekhlua and Cornell Glen scored in the first half, while Katsumi Yusa found the back of the net in the second half from a Sony Norde corner. The Mariners wrapped up the month on a high, in their first away match of the I-League at the Balewadi Sports Complex, Pune drubbing the new league outfits DSK Shivajians 2–0, courtesy of a brace from Sony Norde.

February
Bagan started off the month on a very low note, with a humiliating 6–0 loss to Shandong Luneng at Jinan in the preliminary round 2 of the AFC Champions League which eliminated them from the competition and put them in the group stage of the AFC Cup. They could not return to winning ways even on Indian soil where they were held to a 0–0 draw by Mumbai in an away encounter at the Cooperage Football Stadium, Mumbai. The Green and Maroons returned to winning ways by defeating Bengaluru FC 2–0 at the Sree Kanteerava Stadium. Jeje Lalpekhlua and Sony Norde found the back of the net in the match and this win propelled Bagan to the 2nd position in the I-League table. In their next match at home they managed a 1–1 draw with Shillong Lajong, thanks to a Jeje Lalpekhlua strike which ensured that they reached the top of the table. They guaranteed that they stay at the top at mid-season, when they defeated Sporting Goa 1–0 in a home game, courtesy of the solitary goal from their captain for the match, Katsumi Yusa. Mohun Bagan kicked off their AFC Cup campaign in style as they demolished Maziya of Maldives 5–2 in a home encounter at the Indira Gandhi Athletic Stadium, Guwahati. Jeje Lalpekhlua and Cornell Glen scored braces after Sony Norde had netted in a beautiful curling free kick to open the scoring for Bagan against the Maldives outfit. They continued the same form into the return leg of the I-League where they defeated Salgaocar 3–1 to wrap up the month on a high. Cornell Glen returned to goals in the I-League scoring a brace, while Jeje Lalpekhlua scored the other goal.

March
The Green and Maroon brigade started off the month with a 1–1 draw against Sporting Goa in an away encounter which ensured they maintained the top spot in the I-League after 10 matches. On 3 March 2016 the AIFF suspended Bagan's head coach Sanjoy Sen for 8 I-League matches and fined him Rs. 10 lakhs for his comments against the Federation made after the AFC Champions League match against the Tampines Rovers on 27 January 2016. Sanjoy Sen made the comments after the AIFF refused to reschedule Mohun Bagan's I-League match in spite of their close schedule in the AFC Champions League. Mohun Bagan continued their AFC Cup campaign in style when they travelled away to Hong Kong and convincingly defeated South China 4–0, courtesy of goals from Jeje Lalpekhlua, Cornell Glen, Lenny Rodrigues and Sony Norde. Bagan returned to winning ways in the I-League, cementing their place at the top of the table with an emphatic 2–0 win over Mumbai thanks to goals from Katsumi Yusa and Sony Norde. The Green and Maroons continued their amazing form in the AFC Cup with a 3–2 victory over Yangon United at the Indira Gandhi Stadium, Guwahati courtesy of a brace from Jeje and a sublime header from Sony Norde. This win ensured Mohun Bagan remained at the top of their group. Mohun Bagan lost their first match of the I-League 1–2 owing to a shambolic display against Aizawl to end the month on a disappointing note. On 31 March 2016 the AIFF Appeals Committee reduced the suspension of Sanjoy Sen from 8 matches to 4 and halved the amount of fine payable to Rs. 5 lakhs.

April

Mohun Bagan were up against arch rivals East Bengal in the first match of the month on 2 April 2016. However, in spite of a spirited display by the Green and Maroon brigade, luck was not on their side when they succumbed to a 2–1 loss. East Bengal went ahead in the game, courtesy of a controversial penalty awarded in the 39th minute and doubled their lead in the 73rd. Bagan pulled one back, courtesy of a scintillating header from Katsumi Yusa. In the final moments of the match Bagan got a golden chance to draw level from the penalty spot but a feeble effort from Jeje Lalpekhlua was saved by the goalkeeper comfortably. Bagan still remained top of the table in spite of the loss but had played a match more than the other teams in championship contention. Bagan made the championship more difficult for themselves when they drew 2–2 against Shillong Lajong in an away encounter. Jeje Lalpekhlua and Katsumi Yusa gave Bagan the lead twice in the match but a late last minute equaliser by Uilliams Bomfim Souza broke Green and Maroon hearts all over the country. The Mariners were virtually out of the championship contention when they managed to salvage only a point following their 3–3 draw with newbies DSK Shivajians. To add insult to injury their assistant coach Sankarlal Chakraborty was handed out a 2 match suspension and a monetary fine by the AIFF on the same day because of abusive language used against the referee in the derby match on 2 April 2016. Mohun Bagan played their 5th consecutive match without a win when they pulled off a 1–1 draw with Yangon United in their AFC Cup away match. The hosts went ahead in the 26th minute only to be equalised 16 minutes later by Cornell Glen. Bagan's consecutive I-League title dream crashed when Bengaluru FC defeated Salgaocar 2–0 at home to lift the I-League for the second time in history. This reduced the Mohun Bagan–Bengaluru FC match on 23 April to a mere formality. Mohun Bagan humiliated the recently crowned I-League champions, Bengaluru FC 5–0 to return to winning ways in the I-League. Mohun Bagan went ahead 4–0 within the first 30 minutes of the match, courtesy of goals from Glen, Lenny Rodrigues, Luciano Sabrosa and the young Azharuddin Mallick. In the second half Cornell Glen netted in his second of the match and hammered the last pin in the Bengaluru FC coffin making the scoreline 5–0. Mohun Bagan secured their spot at the top of their group in the AFC Cup when they managed to salvage a point against Maziya with a 1–1 draw. Maziya went ahead in the match first, while a Jeje Lalpekhlua header pulled it back for Bagan in the dying stages of the match.

May

Mohun Bagan started off the month on a positive note when they defeated Salgaocar in a quarter final away encounter of the Federation Cup. Jeje scored a brace while Abhishek Das netted in the other goal for Bagan. In the return leg of the quarter final tie, the Mariners demolished Salgaocar 4–0 riding on a brace from Haitian playmaker Sony Norde and goals from Katsumi Yusa and Jeje Lalpekhlua. This win ensured Bagan a place in the semi-finals of the Federation Cup. The Green and Maroon brigade thumped Shillong Lajong 5–0 in their home tie in the Federation Cup semi-final. Jeje scored a hat-trick while the other two goals came from Bikramjit Singh and young Azharuddin. Such a dominating win put Bagan in a hugely advantageous position before their away encounter. Mohun Bagan's 'unbeaten at home' streak came to an end with a demoralising 3–0 loss against South China in their final, but inconsequential group game, in the AFC Cup campaign. This loss however did not affect Bagan's position at the top of the group and they finished the group stage as group toppers to set up a clash with the Singapore-based club Tampines Rovers in the round of 16. In the return leg away encounter of the semi-final of the Federation Cup, Bagan played out a 0–0 draw with their opponents Shillong Lajong to secure a place in the final, by virtue of a 5–0 aggregate score. Mohun Bagan sealed their first trophy in the season, when they were crowned champions of the Federation Cup after the final match. Mohun Bagan defeated underdogs Aizawl 5–0 with a brace from Jeje Lalpekhlua and goals each from Sony Norde, Dhanachandra Singh and Bikramjit Singh. Mohun Bagan fielded a very weakened side owing to injuries in the last match of their season against the Tampines Rovers in their AFC Cup Round of 16 match. They were unable to finish the season on a high as they went down 2–1 to their Singaporean opponents and thus bowed out of the 2016 edition of the competition. A highly weakened Mohun Bagan were further weakened by the injury of striker Cornell Glen in the 40th minute. It was the visitors who opened scoring in the 63rd minute with a Jordan Webb goal. Bagan did not delay much to strike back as Bikramjit Singh scored a scorcher of a goal to make it 1–1. This remained the scoreline at the end of 90 minutes and thus the match headed into extra time. In the 116th minute of the match it was Afiq Yunos who slotted in a corner kick to give the Tampines Rovers the winning goal.

Transfers

In

Pre-season

Mid-season

Out

Pre-season

Mid-season

Kits
Supplier: Shiv Naresh / Sponsors: Legion

Squad

First-team squad

{| class="wikitable" style="text-align:center; font-size:90%; width:80%"
|-
!style="background:#7A1024; color:white; text-align:center;"|Squad no.
!style="background:#1A5026; color:white; text-align:center;"|Name
!style="background:#7A1024; color:white; text-align:center;"|Nationality
!style="background:#1A5026; color:white; text-align:center;"|Position
!style="background: #7A1024; color:white; text-align:center;"|Date of birth (age)
|-
!colspan=6 style="background:#7a1024; color:white; text-align:center;"|Goalkeepers
|-
|1
|Arnab Das Sharma
|
|GK
|
|-
|22
|Vinay Singh
|
|GK
|
|-
|24
|Debjit Majumder
|
|GK
|
|-
|31
|Shilton Pal (captain)
|
|GK
|
|-
!colspan=6 style="background:#1A5026; color:white; text-align:center;"|Defenders
|-
|2
|Luciano Sabrosa
|
|DF
|
|-
|3
|Raju Gaikwad
|
|DF
|
|-
|4
|Kingshuk Debnath
|
|DF
|
|-
|5
|Dhanachandra Singh
|
|DF
|
|-
|12
|Pritam Kotal
|
|DF
|
|-
|14
|Sarthak Golui
|
|DF
|
|-
|21
|Sanjay Balmuchu
|
|DF
|
|-
|26
|Shouvik Ghosh
|
|DF
|
|-
|28
|Abhishek Das(loaned from  Chennaiyin)
|
|DF
|
|-
|33
|Prabir Das
|
|DF
|
|-
|39
|Suman Hazra
|
|DF
|—
|-
!colspan=6 style="background:#7a1024; color:white; text-align:center;"|Midfielders
|-
|6
|Bikramjit Singh
|
|MF
|
|-
|8
|Lalkamal Bhowmick
|
|MF
|
|-
|9
|Kean Lewis
|
|MF
|
|-
|10
|Katsumi Yusa (vice-captain)
|
|MF
|
|-
|11
|Pronay Halder
|
|MF
|
|-
|16
|Sony Norde
|
|MF
|
|-
|17
|Ram Malik
|
|MF
|
|-
|20
|Brandon Fernandes(loaned from Mumbai City)
|
|MF
|
|-
|23
|Souvik Chakraborty
|
|MF
|
|-
|25
|Tirthankar Sarkar
|
|MF
|
|-
|27
|Adarsh Tamang
|
|MF
|
|-
|30
|Pankaj Moula
|
|MF
|
|-
|32
|Robinson Singh
|
|MF
|
|-
|34
|Manish Bhargav
|
|MF
|
|-
|42
|Lenny Rodrigues
|
|MF
|
|-
!colspan=6 style="background:#1A5026; color:white; text-align:center;"|Forwards
|-
|7
|Jeje Lalpekhlua
|
|FW
|
|-
|13
|Cornell Glen
|
|FW
|
|-
|15
|Balwant Singh
|
|FW
|
|-
|35
|Azharuddin Mallick
|
|FW
|
|-
|40
|Subhash Singh(loaned from Mumbai City)
|
|FW
|
|-

Technical staff
{| class="wikitable"
|-
! Position
! Name
|-
| Chief coach
| Sanjoy Sen
|-
| Assistant coach
| Sankarlal Chakraborty
|-
| Goalkeeping coach
| Arpan Dey
|-
| Physical Trainer
| Djair Miranda Garcia
|-
| Physiotherapist
| Abhinandan Chatterjee
|-
| Club Doctor
| Dr. Protim Ray
|-
| Team Manager
| Satyajit Chatterjee

Statistics

Calcutta Football League stats

Last updated: 14 September 2015Source: Statistics

Goal scorers
{| class="wikitable" style="text-align:center; font-size:95%"
|-
!No.
!Pos.
!Nat.
!Name
!Goal(s)
!Appearance(s)
|-
|9
|FW
|
|Dudu Omagbemi
|5
|7
|-
|10
|MF
|
|Katsumi Yusa
|5
|10
|-
|9
|MF
|
|Kean Lewis
|2
|9
|-
|17
|MF
|
|Ram Malik
|1
|6
|-
|35
|FW
|
|Azharuddin Mallick
|1
|8
|-
|8
|MF
|
|Lalkamal Bhowmick
|1
|8
|-
|30
|MF
|
|Pankaj Moula
|1
|10
|-
!colspan=4 scope="col"|TOTAL
!scope="col"|
!scope="col"|

Disciplinary record
{| class="wikitable" style="text-align:center; font-size:95%"
!No.
!Pos.
!Nat.
!Player
!!!!!
!Notes
|-
|8
|MF
|
|Lalkamal Bhowmick
|1||1||0
|Missed match: vs Kalighat M.S.(9 September 2015)
|-
|9
|FW
|
|Dudu Omagbemi
|0||1||0
|Missed match: vs Kalighat M.S.(9 September 2015)
|-
|23
|MF
|
|Souvik Chakraborty
|2||0||0
|Missed match: vs Bengal Nagpur Railway(21 August 2015)
|-
|12
|DF
|
|Pritam Kotal
|2||0||0
|Missed match: vs Bengal Nagpur Railway(21 August 2015)
|-
|10
|MF
|
|Katsumi Yusa
|1||0||0
|
|-
|21
|DF
|
|Sanjay Balmuchu
|1||0||0
|
|-
|18
|DF
|
|Sukhen Dey
|1||0||0
|
|-

I-League stats

Last updated: 23 April 2016Source: Statistics

Goal scorers
{| class="wikitable" style="text-align:center; font-size:95%"
|-
!No.
!Pos.
!Nat.
!Name
!Goal(s)
!Appearance(s)
|-
|13||FW||
|Cornell Glen
|11||16
|-
|16||MF||
|Sony Norde
|5||11
|-
|10||MF||
|Katsumi Yusa
|5||16
|-
|7||FW||
|Jeje Lalpekhlua
|4||14
|-
|15||FW||
|Balwant Singh
|2||6
|-
|2||DF||
|Luciano Sabrosa
|2||15
|-
|20||MF||
|Brandon Fernandes
|1||4
|-
|35||FW||
|Azharuddin Mallick
|1||6
|-
|42||MF||
|Lenny Rodrigues
|1||8
|- bgcolor=#efefef
!colspan=4 scope="col"|TOTAL
!scope="col"|
!scope="col"|

Disciplinary record
{| class="wikitable" style="text-align:center; font-size:95%"
!No.
!Pos.
!Nat.
!Player
!!!!!
!Notes
|-
|11
|MF
|
|Pronay Halder
|8||0||0
|Missed match: vs Salgaocar(27 February 2016)Missed match: vs Bengaluru FC(23 April 2016)
|-
|2
|DF
|
|Luciano Sabrosa
|6||0||0
|Missed match: vs Salgaocar(27 February 2016)
|-
|12
|DF
|
|Pritam Kotal
|3||0||0
|
|-
|6
|MF
|
|Bikramjit Singh
|2||0||0
|
|-
|10
|MF
|
|Katsumi Yusa
|2||0||0
|
|-
|3
|DF
|
|Raju Gaikwad
|2||0||0
|
|-
|4
|DF
|
|Kingshuk Debnath
|2||0||0
|
|-
|5
|DF
|
|Dhanachandra Singh
|2||0||0
|
|-
|13
|FW
|
|Cornell Glen
|1||0||0
|
|-
|15
|FW
|
|Balwant Singh
|1||0||0
|
|-
|23
|MF
|
|Souvik Chakraborty
|1||0||0
|
|-

AFC Champions League stats

Last updated: 2 February 2016Source: Statistics

Goal scorers
{| class="wikitable" style="text-align:center; font-size:95%"
|-
!No.
!Pos.
!Nat.
!Name
!Goal(s)
!Appearance(s)
|-
|13||FW||
|Cornell Glen
|1||1
|-
|7||FW||
|Jeje Lalpekhlua
|1||2
|-
|10||MF||
|Katsumi Yusa
|1||2
|- bgcolor=#efefef
!colspan=4 scope="col"|TOTAL
!scope="col"|
!scope="col"|

Disciplinary record
{| class="wikitable" style="text-align:center; font-size:95%"
!No.
!Pos.
!Nat.
!Player
!!!!!
!Notes
|-
|11
|MF
|
|Pronay Halder
|1||0||0
|
|-
|4
|DF
|
|Kingshuk Debnath
|1||0||0
|
|-
|28
|DF
|
|Abhishek Das
|1||0||0
|
|-
|24
|GK
|
|Debjit Majumder
|1||0||0
|
|-

AFC Cup stats

Last updated: 24 May 2016Source: Statistics

Goal scorers
{| class="wikitable" style="text-align:center; font-size:95%"
|-
!No.
!Pos.
!Nat.
!Name
!Goal(s)
!Appearance(s)
|-
|7||FW||
|Jeje Lalpekhlua
|6
|7
|-
|13||FW||
|Cornell Glen
|4
|5
|-
|16||MF||
|Sony Norde
|3
|3
|-
|6||MF||
|Bikramjit Singh
|1
|6
|-
|42||MF||
|Lenny Rodrigues
|1
|7
|- bgcolor=#efefef
!colspan=4 scope="col"|TOTAL
!scope="col"|
!scope="col"|

Disciplinary record
{| class="wikitable" style="text-align:center; font-size:95%"
!No.
!Pos.
!Nat.
!Player
!!!!!
!Notes
|-
|6
|MF
|
|Bikramjit Singh
|2||0||0
|Missed match: vs South China(11 May 2016)
|-
|3
|DF
|
|Raju Gaikwad
|2||0||0
|
|-
|2
|DF
|
|Luciano Sabrosa
|2||0||0
|Missed match: vs Maziya(27 April 2016)
|-
|26
|DF
|
|Shouvik Ghosh
|2||0||0
|Missed match: vs Tampines Rovers(24 May 2016)
|-
|7
|FW
|
|Jeje Lalpekhlua
|1||0||0
|
|-
|13
|FW
|
|Cornell Glen
|1||0||0
|
|-
|11
|MF
|
|Pronay Halder
|1||0||0
|
|-
|5
|DF
|
|Dhanachandra Singh
|1||0||0
|
|-
|21
|DF
|
|Sanjay Balmuchu
|1||0||0
|
|-
|1
|GK
|
|Arnab Das Sharma
|1||0||0
|
|-

Federation Cup stats

Last updated: 21 May 2016Source: Statistics

Goal scorers
{| class="wikitable" style="text-align:center; font-size:95%"
|-
!No.
!Pos.
!Nat.
!Name
!Goal(s)
!Appearance(s)
|-
|7||FW||
|Jeje Lalpekhlua
|8
|5
|-
|16||MF||
|Sony Norde
|3
|4
|-
|6||MF||
|Bikramjit Singh
|2
|4
|-
|28||DF||
|Abhishek Das
|1
|1
|-
|35||FW||
|Azharuddin Mallick
|1
|4
|-
|10||MF||
|Katsumi Yusa
|1
|5
|-
|5||DF||
|Dhanachandra Singh
|1
|5
|- bgcolor=#efefef
!colspan=4 scope="col"|TOTAL
!scope="col"|
!scope="col"|

Disciplinary record
{| class="wikitable" style="text-align:center; font-size:95%"
!No.
!Pos.
!Nat.
!Player
!!!!!
!Notes
|-
|11
|MF
|
|Pronay Halder
|1||0||0
|
|-
|4
|DF
|
|Kingshuk Debnath
|1||0||0
|
|-

Player statistics

Appearances and goals

Last updated: 24 May 2016  Apps: (Matches Started)+(Substitute Appearances)

Disciplinary record
{| class="wikitable" style="text-align:center; font-size:95%"
!rowspan="2"|No.
!rowspan="2"|Pos.
!rowspan="2"|Nat.
!rowspan="2"|Player
!colspan="3"|CFL
!colspan="3"|I-League
!colspan="3"|ACL and AFC Cup
!colspan="3"|Fed Cup
!colspan="3"|Total
!rowspan="2"|Notes
|-
!!!!!
!!!!!
!!!!!
!!!!!
!!!!!
|-
|8
|MF
|
|Lalkamal Bhowmick
|1||1||0
|0||0||0
|0||0||0
|0||0||0
|1||1||0
|Missed match: vs Kalighat M.S.(9 September 2015)
|-
|9
|FW
|
|Dudu Omagbemi
|0||1||0
|0||0||0
|0||0||0
|0||0||0
|0||1||0
|Missed match: vs Kalighat M.S.(9 September 2015)
|-
|11
|MF
|
|Pronay Halder
|0||0||0
|8||0||0
|2||0||0
|1||0||0
|11||0||0
|Missed match: vs Salgaocar(27 February 2016)Missed match: vs Bengaluru FC(23 April 2016)
|-
|2
|DF
|
|Luciano Sabrosa
|0||0||0
|6||0||0
|2||0||0
|0||0||0
|8||0||0
|Missed match: vs Salgaocar(27 February 2016)Missed match: vs Maziya(27 April 2016)
|-
|12
|DF
|
|Pritam Kotal
|2||0||0
|3||0||0
|0||0||0
|0||0||0
|5||0||0
|Missed match: vs Bengal Nagpur Railway(21 August 2015)
|-
|6
|MF
|
|Bikramjit Singh
|0||0||0
|2||0||0
|2||0||0
|0||0||0
|4||0||0
|Missed match: vs South China(11 May 2016)
|-
|3
|DF
|
|Raju Gaikwad
|0||0||0
|2||0||0
|2||0||0
|0||0||0
|4||0||0
|
|-
|4
|DF
|
|Kingshuk Debnath
|0||0||0
|2||0||0
|1||0||0
|1||0||0
|4||0||0
|
|-
|10
|MF
|
|Katsumi Yusa
|1||0||0
|2||0||0
|0||0||0
|0||0||0
|3||0||0
|
|-
|23
|MF
|
|Souvik Chakraborty
|2||0||0
|1||0||0
|0||0||0
|0||0||0
|3||0||0
|Missed match: vs Bengal Nagpur Railway(21 August 2015)
|-
|5
|DF
|
|Dhanachandra Singh
|0||0||0
|2||0||0
|1||0||0
|0||0||0
|3||0||0
|
|-
|13
|FW
|
|Cornell Glen
|0||0||0
|1||0||0
|1||0||0
|0||0||0
|2||0||0
|
|-
|21
|DF
|
|Sanjay Balmuchu
|1||0||0
|0||0||0
|1||0||0
|0||0||0
|2||0||0
|
|-
|26
|DF
|
|Shouvik Ghosh
|0||0||0
|0||0||0
|2||0||0
|0||0||0
|2||0||0
|Missed match: vs Tampines Rovers(24 May 2016)
|-
|7
|FW
|
|Jeje Lalpekhlua
|0||0||0
|0||0||0
|1||0||0
|0||0||0
|1||0||0
|
|-
|15
|FW
|
|Balwant Singh
|0||0||0
|1||0||0
|0||0||0
|0||0||0
|1||0||0
|
|-
|28
|DF
|
|Abhishek Das
|0||0||0
|0||0||0
|1||0||0
|0||0||0
|1||0||0
|
|-
|18
|DF
|
|Sukhen Dey
|1||0||0
|0||0||0
|0||0||0
|0||0||0
|1||0||0
|
|-
|1
|GK
|
|Arnab Das Sharma
|0||0||0
|0||0||0
|1||0||0
|0||0||0
|1||0||0
|
|-
|24
|GK
|
|Debjit Majumder
|0||0||0
|0||0||0
|1||0||0
|0||0||0
|1||0||0
|
|-

Competitions

Overall

Last updated: 24 May 2016Source: Competitions

Overview

Calcutta Football League

I-League

Results by round

AFC Champions League

Preliminary round 1

Preliminary round 2

AFC Cup

Group stage

Round of 16

Federation Cup

Quarter finals

|-

Semi-finals

|-

Final

|-

Results summary

Matches

Calcutta Football League

I-League

AFC Champions League

AFC Cup

Federation Cup

Notes

References

Mohun Bagan AC seasons
Mohun Bagan